Jan Ored Lundin (born 3 September 1942) is a retired Swedish swimmer who won three bronze medals in the 4 × 100 m and 4 × 200 m freestyle relays at the 1962 and 1966 European Aquatics Championships. He finished fifth in these events at the 1964 Summer Olympics.

References

1942 births
Swimmers at the 1964 Summer Olympics
Swedish male freestyle swimmers
Olympic swimmers of Sweden
Living people
European Aquatics Championships medalists in swimming
Swimmers from Stockholm